The Beiteddine Palace Museum is installed in the old stables, which once housed riders and horses of the Beiteddine Palace in Beiteddine, Lebanon. 
The museum displays a significant collection of Byzantine mosaics. The majority of them come from the site of the coastal city of Jieh, the ancient Porphyreon. The Byzantine-Greek inscriptions appearing on the mosaics date them back to the 5th and 6th centuries A.D. Further mosaics from different Lebanese sites are displayed in  the adjacent palace gardens.

References

Archaeological museums in Lebanon
Museums of Ancient Near East in Lebanon
Byzantine mosaics